Clivina helmsi is a species of ground beetle in the subfamily Scaritinae. It was described by Blackburn in 1892.

References

helmsi
Beetles described in 1892